The Mama is a river in Irkutsk Oblast and Buryatia, Russia. It is a left tributary of the Vitim, the second largest in basin area after the Tsipa.

The Mamsko-Chuysky District of Irkutsk Oblast is named after rivers Mama and Chuya. The settlements of Bramya, Slyudyanka, Lugovsky, Zarya and Mama are located by the river.

Course
The river basin is located on the slopes and foothills of the Upper Angara Range. Rivers Left Mama (Levaya Mama) and Right Mama (Pravaya Mama), which form the Mama river, have their sources in the heights of the range, at  the first and at about  the second. They are fast-flowing mountain rivers, with rapids and waterfalls. After the confluence the Mama flows roughly northeastwards across a fragmented floodplain slightly meandering among rocky banks. The river is navigable downstream from the confluence of the Bramya, a small tributary. Finally the Mama meets the lower course of the Vitim  from its mouth in the Lena.

The river is located in an area marked by permafrost. Most of the territory adjacent to the river is covered by larch taiga and Siberian pine in the upper reaches, crowned by golets bare summits.

References

External links 
 Мама (река) Article in Great Soviet Encyclopedia

Rivers of Buryatia
Rivers of Irkutsk Oblast